History of the Caliphs is a book written by al-Suyuti (c. 1445-1505), the classic Sunni scholar. It was published in English in 1881 in Calcutta and republished in English at Oriental Press in 1970.

The book covers several periods:
 Rashidun Caliphate
 Umayyad Caliphate
 Abbasid Caliphate
 Fatimid Caliphate

Translation
The History of the Khalifahs who took the Right Way is a partial translation of History of the Caliphs. 
Its translator, Abdassamad Clarke, chose to translate the biographies of the first four "Rightly Guided Caliphs" adding to them Imam Hasan ibn Ali, because of his action in healing the divisions in the early community and, according to Sunni Muslims' opinion, legitimately handing power over to Mu'awiyah ibn Abi Sufyan.

External links

Review of Suyuti's Tarikh al-Khulafah (History of the Caliphs)
Urdu Translation of Suyuti's Tarikh al-Khulafa

15th-century history books
Caliphs
Sunni literature
Books about monarchs
Books by al-Suyuti